Chartreuse may refer to:

Food and drink 
 Chartreuse (liqueur), a French liqueur
 Chartreuse (dish), a French dish of vegetables or meat tightly wrapped in vegetable leaves and cooked in a mould

Religion 
 Carthusians, a Catholic religious order and their buildings
 Grande Chartreuse, a monastery in the Chartreuse Mountains
 Any Carthusian monastery, in the French language

Music 
 La chartreuse de Parme (opera), of 1839 by Henri Sauguet, based on the Stendhal novel
 "Chartreuse", a 2012 song by ZZ Top about the French liqueur

Other 
 Chartreuse (color), a yellow-green color named after the liqueur
 Shades of chartreuse, a list of colors that fall under the category of chartreuse.
 Chartreuse Mountains, a range of mountains in France
 The Charterhouse of Parma (French: La Chartreuse de Parme), an 1839 novel by Stendhal

See also
 Chartreux, a breed of cat
 Institution des Chartreux, a private school
 Charterhouse (disambiguation)